Susan Heitler is an American clinical psychologist. She practiced from 1975 to 2020 at the Rose Medical Center in Denver, treating individuals, couples and families. She specializes in treating depression, anger, anxiety, marital problems, parental alienation, and conflict resolution

Biography 
Susan Heitler was born in 1945. She graduated from Harvard University in 1967, with a B.A. degree in English. She received her MEd. from Boston University in 1968, specializing in the education of emotionally disturbed children. Heitler was awarded a PhD in clinical psychology from New York University in 1975.

In her clinical work, Heitler has specialized in the treatment of couples and in giving workshops to train individual therapy practitioners in techniques of couples' therapy. Heitler's writings have contributed an integrative therapy map for eclectic therapists (therapists who use techniques from multiple schools of treatment).  In addition, her writing has focused on increasing understanding of the process of conflict resolution. She has done research on and written about conflict resolution as an element of psychotherapy treatment.

Heitler has authored several books regarding psychological well-being and conflict resolution intended for general audiences. One of the books, "From Conflict to Resolution", was reviewed by the Colorado Psychological Association Bulletin in May 2006. According to the author of the review, "Heitler wrote "From Conflict to Resolution" to bring understandings of collaborative solution building from the fields of mediation, law and business to the realms of mental health and psychotherapy."

She gave a TEDx Talk in Wilmington Delaware in 2016, "Lift Depression With These 3 Prescriptions- Without-Pills" She presented the 2007 Shane Marie Morrow lecture at the Denver Metro College Department of Psychology. The lecture topic was on the psychology of terrorism, and was entitled, "Pleasure to Kill You". She is a fellow of the American Psychological Association.

Books 

 FROM CONFLICT TO RESOLUTION: Strategies for Diagnosis and Treatment of Distressed Individual, Couples and Families
 Prescriptions Without Pills: For Relief from Depression, Anger, Anxiety, and More
 The Power of Two: Secrets to a Strong and Loving Marriage
 The Power of Two Workbook: Communication Skills for a Strong & Loving Marriage
 Depression A Disorder of Power (Audio CD)
 Working with Couples in Conflict (Audio Cassette)
 Conflict Resolution for Couples (Audio Cassette)
 Working with Couples in Conflict (Audio Cassette)
 David Decides: No More Thumbsucking

Journal articles 

 Combined individual/marital therapy: A conflict resolution framework and ethical considerations
 The angry couple : conflict focused treatment
 Review of Unifying psychotherapy: Principles, methods, and evidence from clinical science.
 Review of Emotion, psychotherapy, and change.
 Review of Comprehensive handbook of psychotherapy integration.
 Review of Comprehensive casebook of cognitive therapy.
 Review of The compleat therapist.
A randomized clinical trial of online–biblio relationship education for expectant couples. This study, by outside researchers, evaluates outcomes of the online marriage education program based on Heitler's book, "The Power of Two".

References 

American clinical psychologists
American women psychologists
21st-century American psychologists
20th-century American psychologists
HCA Healthcare people
American family and parenting writers
American women bloggers
American bloggers
Jewish bloggers
American women columnists
1945 births
Harvard Graduate School of Arts and Sciences alumni
Boston University School of Medicine alumni
New York University Grossman School of Medicine alumni
Family therapists
21st-century American women writers
20th-century American women writers
American psychology writers
20th-century American non-fiction writers
21st-century American non-fiction writers
American self-help writers
Fellows of the American Psychological Association
Jewish women scientists
20th-century American Jews
21st-century American Jews
Jewish American journalists
Jewish American scientists
Living people